Drive All Night is an EP by Irish musician Glen Hansard. It was released in December 2013 under Epitaph Records. The title track is a cover of a Bruce Springsteen song, a non-single album track from his 1980 album The River. Besides guest vocals from Pearl Jam frontman Eddie Vedder, the song also features Jake Clemons, current member of the E Street Band.

Track listing

References

2013 EPs
Glen Hansard albums